Alphonsus Chukwuebuka Dike (born 8 March 2001), commonly known as Alphonsus Ebuka or simply Ebuka, is a Nigerian professional footballer who plays as a midfielder for La Nucía, on loan from Superstars Academy.

Career statistics

Club

Notes

References

2001 births
Living people
People from Abuja
Nigerian footballers
Association football midfielders
Liga Portugal 2 players
FC Porto players
FC Porto B players
CF La Nucía players
Nigerian expatriate footballers
Expatriate footballers in the Gambia
Nigerian expatriate sportspeople in Portugal
Expatriate footballers in Portugal
Nigerian expatriate sportspeople in Spain
Expatriate footballers in Spain